DeShong is a surname. Notable people with the surname include:

Alfred O. Deshong (1837–1913), American industrialist, philanthropist and art collector
Andrea DeShong (born 1962), American boxer
Jimmie DeShong (1909–1993), American professional baseball pitcher
John O. Deshong (1807–1881), American businessman and banker
Peter Deshong (1781–1827), American businessman and banker